Jermaine Love-Roberts (born March 27, 1989) is an American professional basketball player who plays for Nizhny Novgorod of the VTB United League. A 6'3", 186 lbs combo guard, Love played for Prairie State College (where he became the school's first All-America selection in men's basketball) and at University of Illinois at Springfield before going overseas to Lithuania to play for BC Palanga and BC Vilnius of the National Basketball League.

High school
Love attended Rich East High School, in Park Forest, Illinois, where he played high school basketball. He earned All-Conference honors in basketball at Rich East, and was also a member of the conference champions in track and field as well.

College career
Love played college basketball at the Prairie State College, from 2008 to 2010 and at the Illinois-Springfield from 2010 to 2012. As a senior, he averaged 16.5 points, 4.8 rebounds, and 1.7 assists per game.

Professional career
On September 27, 2014, Love joined MRU Vilnius in Lithuania.

On August 24, 2015 he moved to the first division, signing with Lietkabelis Panevėžys. On August 12, 2016 Love moved to BC Nevėžis.

The next year, after a successful tryout, he joined Trefl Sopot of the PLK. With Trefl Sopot, he went on to average 13.6 points, 3.3 rebounds and 3 assists per game.

On July 4, 2018, Love joined Holargos of the Greek Basket League.

After starting the 2019-2020 campaign with Italian club Scaligera Verona, Love returned to Greece and signed with Kolossos Rodou on January 22, 2020, replacing the injured Donovan Jackson. He then finished out the season with Israeli club Hapoel Holon and averaged 11.9 points, 3.1 rebounds and 2.6 assists. 

On July 31, 2020, Love signed with PAOK of the Greek Basket League. On July 3, 2021, Love renewed his contract with the Greek club. During the 2021-22 campaign, in a total of 22 league games, he averaged 14 points, 2.8 rebounds, 2.5 assists and 1 steal, playing around 27 minutes per contest. He also served as the team's captain. On July 5, 2022, Love parted ways with PAOK.

References 

1989 births
Living people
American expatriate basketball people in Greece
American expatriate basketball people in Israel
American expatriate basketball people in Italy
American expatriate basketball people in Lithuania
American expatriate basketball people in Poland
American men's basketball players
Basketball players from Illinois
BC Lietkabelis players
BC Nevėžis players
BC Nizhny Novgorod players
College men's basketball players in the United States
Guards (basketball)
Holargos B.C. players
Junior college men's basketball players in the United States
Kolossos Rodou B.C. players
P.A.O.K. BC players
Point guards
Prairie State College alumni
Shooting guards
Trefl Sopot players
University of Illinois at Springfield alumni